Konrad Adenauer (1876-1967) was a conservative German statesman and Chancellor of Germany (1949-1963).

Konrad Adenauer may also refer to:

Konrad Adenauer (aircraft), airplane used by the German government
Konrad Adenauer Foundation